The Center for Citizen Initiatives is the brainchild of an American citizen, Sharon Tennison, who in the early 1980s determined in a period of desperation to try to reduce tensions between the two superpowers. Tennison and a growing group of business and professional Americans made the decision to try their hands at diplomacy and began putting together their first trip to the "land of the enemy."

The Cold War was at a peak - the KAL 007 airliner had just been downed by Soviet Interceptor Jets killing all passengers aboard, and the US and the USSR had 50,000 nuclear weapons on launch pads aimed at each other. Scientists predicted if 10% of the weapons were detonated, nuclear fallout would shortly leave planet Earth lifeless.

At that time few Americans had ever seen a Soviet citizen, nor had Soviets met any real Americans - and there was no precedent or pattern how it might happen. Upon arriving in Moscow, Leningrad and Tbilisi, CCI travelers spread to Soviet sidewalks, market places, schools and to rare apartments at the invitation of the Soviets who risked chancing encounters with the KGB. CCI's first trip changed the lives of the travelers - each came back to America committed to be public educators. Following the first trip, CCI started a travel program, which took over a thousand Americans to the USSR as citizen diplomats. Each traveler agreed to do six months of public education upon returning to their home cities. This work began to spread the citizen diplomacy concept and the education of ordinary American citizens regarding the risks at stake. See citizen diplomacy

Citizen diplomacy
Unbeknownst to CCI's small collection of concerned citizens, a new movement was about to be born. Groups of Americans in Washington state, upstate New York, Tucson, Arizona, Chicago, Florida and other places around the United States, were meeting in homes, universities and churches to determine how they could take the nuclear nightmare into their own hands.

On September 16, 1983, twenty would-be "citizen diplomats" and a film crew of four left the United States and headed for Moscow. Note: Originally the organization was named the Center for U.S.-USSR Initiatives (CUUI). With the dissolution of the USSR in 1990, the organization took its present name. See CCI's history

Starting AA in Russia
From 1983 forward, Russian citizens questioned CCI travelers if Americans had a solution for alcoholism. AA Big Books began being smuggled in suitcases by citizen diplomats. In 1985, Tennison knocked on the doors of the Ministry of Health of the USSR to try to get permission to bring the AA philosophy to the Soviet Union. Eventually, the request was taken to the USSR's new Party General Secretary, Mikhail Gorbachev. He reportedly said, "Our problem is so great that we must try anything the west has to offer." On April 10, 1986, the first ever AA meeting was held in Kiev, Ukraine by 20 southern California recovering alcoholics, and within three days the second AA meeting was held in Moscow. The starting of AA was a bit rocky in the beginning, but they celebrated AA's twentieth anniversary in Russia in 2006.

Soviets Meet Middle America
In 1988, CCI started a first-ever, non-governmental citizen exchange program, Soviets Meet Middle America (SMMA). In the early stages CCI had to partner with the Soviet Peace Committee. After they failed to allow CCI to choose the citizens to travel, they were terminated. Fortunately, Gorbachev had just appointed a young change maker, Gennady Alferenko, to give exit visas to any Soviet citizen who had an invitation to travel abroad. CCI immediately partnered with Alferenko and soon ordinary Soviet citizens whom CCI travelers had met on their streets were flying across the US to four different cities. Over a two-year period, 400 Soviet citizens in small groups of four persons traveled to 265 American cities, where they stayed in some 800 private homes, and were interviewed by thousands of American newspapers, radio and TV programs. They returned home to the USSR and spread the news that America was a great and luxurious country and full of friendly host families. They became America's finest ambassadors.

Environmental Initiative
In 1987 CCI's Environmental Initiative began by partnering with young Soviet-era environmentalists to defeat a Communist party-promoted Dam in Leningrad's famous Neva River. The program grew and eventually moving into water quality cleanup, nuclear cleanup campaigns around weapons installations, and eventually was awarded the opportunity to map and create a sustainability plan and cleanup program for Russia's acclaimed Lake Baikal, the world's largest and deepest lake. George Davis, an expert in restoring large damaged American sites, was hired to oversee the restoration of the Lake Baikal basin. Francis Underhill Macy was CCI's first environmental director and went on to found the Center for Safe Energy (CSE) after CCI lost USAID funding in 1999. The Environmental Program spanned ten years.

Agricultural Initiative
CCI's ten-year Agricultural Initiative started in 1990 as Soviet agriculture was falling apart due to the breakup up of the whole Soviet food system. The Agricultural Initiative was primarily a response to get food on Russian tables for their survival. Urban gardens, rooftop gardens, support for new private farmers, massive seed lifts, ocean shipments of emergency food supplies were all in motion simultaneously by CCI during that time. CCI brought the concept of the American extension service to the Russia, to help private farmers get the latest agricultural data to operate their new hectares. Cornell University provided extension teaching materials, as did other American universities, which were translated and distributed to 345 Russian agricultural colleges. Martin Price, world rooftop-garden specialist, spread his techniques first in St. Petersburg in 1993. After being picked up by TV, the concept jumped borders to other Russian regions.

Economic Development Program
The Economic Development Program (EDP), the first-ever business training program for young Soviet entrepreneurs, was started by CCI in 1989 with private funds and financial contributions from the Soviet entrepreneurs. Four years later, when the U.S. began funding Russia projects, USAID provided EDP with a $7.3 million grant - and
required that CCI work only in Russia. CCI developed Russian offices in St. Petersburg, Volgograd, Voronezh, Rostov on Don, Ekaterinburg, the Moscow Oblast (Dubna), and Vladivostok. EDP was for English-speaking participants only, which was a limitation for Russia's regions. However, it was a vital first step and the only one of its kind of training at the time. Business libraries were started, American business consultants were assigned to each Russian office, while many Russian entrepreneurs in EDP were absorbing U.S. know-how in companies across America. EDP ran for eight years and was gradually reduced as CCI's largest-ever Productivity Enhancement Program (PEP) for non-English speaking Russians was established.

Productivity Enhancement Program
In 1994 Sharon Tennison found research done by the Marshall Plan's original Productivity Tours designer, Jim Silberman who promoted the Marshall concept to work for post-Socialist countries. Tennison began immediately to adapt the Productivity Tours information into a program for Russia in the 1990s. CCI began implementing the experiment first in 1994 and titled it the Productivity Enhancement Program (PEP). Over the years, PEP became CCI's largest and most dramatically effective program. For more than fifteen years PEP was in constant experimentation. As Russian entrepreneurs evolved rapidly, the program had to be updated and refined every year. From the beginning, CCI partnered with Rotary Clubs across America, in addition to Kiwanis, Optimist, Soroptimist and Lion's Clubs. Over 500 Rotary clubs participated, some taking up to eleven delegations every year. The extraordinary amount of volunteerism brought to PEP kept program costs low and the benefits, in terms of numbers of Russian entrepreneurs served, high. CCI never paid hosting civic clubs or American business trainers - they all gave their time and expertise pro bono to PEP.

In 2004 CCI's State Department contract was terminated prematurely. CCI developed the means to keep the program running and eventually Russian entrepreneurs were paying the full costs of training and CCI's operational costs. By 2008, to keep PEP afloat, CCI had cut staff, moved operations, reduced salaries and the number of PEP participants. In late 2008 as Russia was pulled into the global financial crisis, Russian entrepreneurs were no longer able to pay for the business training in the U.S. Participants canceled 2009 training trips, and CCI was forced to close the doors of the PEP program in February.

CCI's smaller programs
Between 1993 and 2003 CCI ran many other smaller programs, which contributed to Russia's developing private sector:

- Schultz Awards Program - loans in return for equivalent charitable service
- Russian Initiative for Self-Employment - a Micro-enterprise Incubator 
- Non-Profit Management Initiative - work with new nonprofit initiators  
- Presidential Management Training Program  
- Consulting Services for Russian Enterprises  
- Managed renovating of the School of Management of St. Petersburg State University 
- Next Steps Anti-Corruption Program 
- the Russian Leaders Institute - promoting leadership training for the best of CCI-trained entrepreneurs and taking 100 of them to Washington for Congressional meeting
- Angels for Angels - computer laboratories for Russian orphanages

"Russia: Other Points of View" Blog 
Announced in Sharon Tennison's June 9, 2008 President's Report, CCI opened a blog Russia: Other Points of View with the intention to promote better coverage of Russia in the US media. The blog hosts a companion project called Russia Media Watch, which analyzes select pieces of western mainstream media for accuracy or inaccuracy of content based on seventeen objective criteria and journalistic standards. Beginning in mid-2009, analyses will be sent to journalists, publications
and to a wide list of US Congressmen, think tanks, business and civic leaders throughout the country.

Support for Russian Dictator 
While advocating for peace, Tennison has repeatedly championed Russia’s dictator. For example, in 2018, she wrote, “Putin isn’t the problem, friends. The problem is the projection of our own ‘shadow’ on Putin and Russia.” In September 2020, Tennison observed, “Putin seems to ignore detractors and continues efforts to create venues to bring peoples and countries together despite vilifications.” And the day after Russia’s unprovoked invasion of Ukraine, Tennison posted, “I am deeply concerned about a NATO country being on Russia’s borders in Ukraine … As for Putin’s current dilemma, I’m sorry he felt he had to intervene in Ukraine!”

Funding 
Membership drives, small and large philanthropists, American foundations (The C.S Mott Foundation, Atlantic Philanthropies, the Rockefeller Brothers, the MacArthur Foundation, and numerous family and smaller foundations), and USAID and the U.S. Department of State have all contributed strongly to CCI's financial base over the years.

References

External links 
 Official website
 Blog
 USAID Mission to Russia

Soviet Union–United States relations